The Delaware and Ulster Railroad (DURR) is a heritage railroad based in Arkville, New York.

History

The last regularly scheduled passenger train over the former Ulster & Delaware Railroad (U&D) tracks was operated between Kingston and Oneonta by the New York Central Railroad on March 31, 1954. The tracks were then cut back to Bloomville in July, 1965 to make way for construction of Interstate 88 near Oneonta, and for lack of freight business west of Bloomville. Ownership of the tracks passed to Penn Central in 1968, and to the government-backed Conrail on April 1, 1976. The last westbound freight train over the mountains was operated by Conrail on September 26, 1976, with the return trip to gather up all remaining freight cars taking place on October 2, 1976.

The DURR is a subsidiary of the not-for-profit Catskill Revitalization Corporation, of Stamford, NY, which owns the former U&D railbed between Highmount, New York and Bloomville, New York: 45 miles. The line was acquired from Penn Central in 1980, for $770,000, following the successful regional advocacy for this by noted transportation attorney Donald L. Pevsner. Funding was provided by the A. Lindsay and Olive B. O'Connor Foundation, of Hobart, NY, which currently has $57 million in assets derived from IBM stock that was sold to Mr. O'Connor directly by Thomas Watson, Sr., IBM's founder, in the 1920s. The Foundation conveyed the 45-mile-long line to the Delaware County Towns through which it passed, and these Towns later conveyed it to the non-profit Catskill Revitalization Corporation. The new tourist railroad started operations in 1983, between Highmount and Arkville, NY, and extended operations later to the Arkville-Roxbury, NY segment.

The DURR operates in Delaware County, New York on the former U&D tracks west of Highmount, where the tracks are defunct eastward to a point just east of West Hurley. DURR's operations are currently limited to the Arkville-Roxbury segment. The Highmount-Arkville segment was placed back into service on October 3, 2013, and the Roxbury-Hubbell Corners segment remains out of service.

The Hubbell Corners-Bloomville segment was abandoned; the railbed was converted for use as the Catskill Scenic Rail Trail.

The DURR suffered a major washout at Kelly's Corners on August 28, 2011, as a result of Hurricane Irene. The east branch of the Delaware River undermined approximately a quarter-mile of track along Route 30, and caused minor washouts and scouring at Halcottsville and other locations along the line; service resumed in May 2012.

Rip Van Winkle Flyer
The pride of the DURR is the Rip Van Winkle Flyer, a five-car Budd streamline train used for charters. The train consists of:

 Observation Car: former NYC No. 61, built 1948
 Tavern Lounge: former Minneapolis & St. Louis No. 52, built 1948
 Dining Car: former ACL No. 5936, built 1950
 Vista Dome: former MP 891, built 1948
 Baggage/Generator, former ATSF

The regular train is powered by former Delaware & Hudson 5017, an Alco RS-36, and consists of two flat cars and three former Pennsylvania Railroad MP-54 coaches (441, 444 and 447) lettered for NYC.

Other locomotives at the DURR consist of:

Alco S-4's #1012 and #5106,
GE 44 tonner #76,
EMD NW2 #116

Currently under consideration for restoration is the "Red Heifer" a Model 250 Brill Gas-Electric doodlebug, formerly NYC M-405. This piece of equipment was used extensively during the railroad's early days in 1983.

The railway also owns two flatcars.

The DURR's Roxbury Station is owned by the Ulster & Delaware Railroad Historical Society and is called the Roxbury Depot Museum. Currently, the entire depot is covered by a structure that was put in place while it was used as a lumber and feed dealer. Volunteers are seeking funds for full restoration, as well as seeking to settle remaining issues with the estate of the former owner before work can proceed.

Management
The DURR is owned by the Catskill Revitalization Corporation.
G.V. Stevens, Chief Mechanical Officer and Operations Manager
Ted Latta, Track Supervisor
Ken Dodge, Jr., Signal Maintainer

References
 Delaware, Ulster & Greene County NY Railroad Information (website), courtesy of Philip M. Goldstein
 John M. Ham, Robert K. Bucenec (2003), The Old "Up and Down" Catskill Mountain Branch of the New York Central, Stony Clove & Catskill Mountain Press

External links
 Delaware & Ulster Railroad
 Delaware, Ulster, Greene & Schoharie County Railroad Information: Delaware & Ulster Railroad Comprehensive Locomotive & Equipment Roster

Heritage railroads in New York (state)
Catskills
Tourist attractions in Delaware County, New York